The Little King is a 1930-1975 American gag-a-day comic strip created by Otto Soglow, telling its stories in a style using images and very few words, as in pantomime.

Publication history
Soglow's character first appeared on June 7, 1930, in The New Yorker and soon showed signs of becoming a successful strip. The Little King began publications in comic book issues from 1933, was licensed for a 1933–34 series of animated cartoons by Van Beuren Studios and featured in advertising campaigns for Standard Oil and Royal Pudding (1955).

It became evident early on that William Randolph Hearst was determined to add The Little King to his King Features Syndicate newspaper strips, but he was hindered by Soglow's contractual obligations with The New Yorker. While seeing out the final period of the contract, Soglow produced a placeholder strip for King Features, The Ambassador, quite similar to The Little King in characters, style and story situations. One week after its final publication in The New Yorker, The Little King resumed as a King Features Sunday strip, on September 9, 1934.

The strip continued a successful run with several more animated cartoon appearances and advertising campaigns, and Soglow was awarded the 1966 National Cartoonists Society Reuben Award for the strip. The Little King ran until Soglow's death in 1975. The final strip ran on July 20, 1975.

Format
The strip is notable for having virtually no dialogue; the title character never speaks. The Ambassador was nearly identical in format, and the main characters of the two strips were similar. When The Ambassador gave way for The Little King in 1934, the reader could not be certain if it was the Little King who had arrived into Hearst syndication or the Ambassador who had removed some disguise.

The Little King (mustachioed, bearded, and clad in velvet and ermine) was small of stature, but as wide as he was tall.  He was a childlike, cheerful fellow who lived to have fun.  The final panel of the comic strip often showed His Majesty pursuing a hobby, playing a children's game, flirting with a pretty woman, or otherwise enjoying himself in an unkingly fashion while neglecting his "official" duties.

Animated theatrical shorts
All cartoon shorts were produced by Van Beuren Studios except where otherwise noted. All of the theatrical shorts were released to DVD by Thunderbean Animation. A remastered Blu-ray set is also in production. As in the comic strips, the Little King never speaks in the 1933 and 1934 shorts except for a brief sequence in "Marching Along" (1933).

1933
A.M. to P.M. (Part of Aesop's Fables Series)
A Dizzy Day (Part of Aesop's Fables Series)
The Fatal Note
Marching Along
On the Pan
Pals (aka Christmas Night)

1934
Jest of Honor
Jolly Good Felons
Sultan Pepper
A Royal Good Time
Art for Art's Sake
Cactus King
1936
Betty Boop and the Little King (produced by Fleischer Studios)

Collections 

 The Little King (1933), Farrar & Rinehart 
 Cartoon Monarch: Otto Soglow and the Little King (2012), IDW Publishing's imprint The Library of American Comics

References

External links

 
 
 
Stanley Stories: "Henh! Henh! Hoppin' on the Little King Bandwagon: selections from Dell Four-Color 677, 1956

1930 comics debuts
1975 comics endings
American comic strips
American comics adapted into films
American comics characters
Pantomime comics
Comic strips started in the 1930s
Comic strips ended in the 1970s
Comics characters introduced in 1930
Comics adapted into animated series
Fictional kings
Gag-a-day comics
Male characters in comics
Van Beuren Studios
Works originally published in The New Yorker